Brightside Station may refer to:
 Brightside railway station, in Sheffield, England
 Brightside, California, formerly Brightside Station